Lee Light Grumbine (July 25, 1858 - August 18, 1904) was an American attorney, local historian, and published columnist and poet in the Pennsylvania German language. His dialect pseudonym was "Der Old Schulmashter."

Grumbine was born in Fredericksburg, Pennsylvania and died in Lebanon, Pennsylvania. A graduate of Wesleyan University in Middletown, Connecticut, he was active in the Temperance Movement, and a founding office-holder in the Pennsylvania German Society. In 1889 he became editor of the Lebanon Daily Report newspaper. He notably translated the Rime of the Ancient Mariner by Samuel Taylor Coleridge into Pennsylvania German.

Bibliography
The Marriage of the Muse (1892)
Der Alt Dengelstock: En Gedicht nach der Pennsylvanish-Deutscher Mundart (1898)The Origin and Significance of Our Township Names (1899)The Pennsylvania-German Dialect: A Study of Its Status as a Spoken Dialect and Form of Literary Expression, with Reference to Its Capabilities, and Limitations, and Lines Illustrating Same (1902)Der Dengelstock and other Poems and Translations in the Pennsylvania-German Dialect (1903)

References
In Memoriam Lee L. Grumbine (1904)
Earl C. Haag, A Pennsylvania German Anthology (1988) 
Harry Hess Reichard, Pennsylvania German Dialect Writings and Their Writers (Lancaster: Pennsylvania German Society, 1918.
Earl F. Robacker, Pennsylvania German Literature'' (1943)

See also
Ezra Light Grumbine, brother, also a Pennsylvania German author

External links
Grave at Cedar Hill Cemetery, Fredericksburg

1858 births
1904 deaths
German-American history
Pennsylvania Dutch people
People from Lebanon County, Pennsylvania
American writers in Pennsylvania Dutch
Pennsylvania Dutch culture
German language in the United States
American people of German descent